Jonathan Davis (born 20 March 1988) is a Bahamian sprinter from Eleuthera Bahamas who competed in the 100m and 200 and long jump. He attended Tabernacle Baptist Academy in Freeport, Bahamas, before going on to compete for Hinds Community College.

Davis competed at the 2008 NACAC Under-23 Championships in Athletics and the 2010 NACAC Under-23 Championships in Athletics.
Davis also competed at the 2007 Pan American Junior Athletics Championships. the 2004 CARIFTA Games and 2006 CARIFTA Games.

Personal bests

References

External links
 World Athletics Bio

1988 births
Living people
Bahamian male sprinters
People from Eleuthera
Hinds Community College alumni
Junior college men's track and field athletes in the United States